The Oscar-Zero Missile Alert Facility near Cooperstown, North Dakota, US was listed on the National Register of Historic Places in 2008.  Also known as Oscar-Zero MAF and as O-0 MAF, it exemplifies Utilitarian architecture.  The NRHP listing included 2 contributing buildings, 9 contributing structures, and one contributing object.

It is included in North Dakota's Ronald Reagan Minuteman Missile State Historic Site with the November-33 Launch Facility and is operated by the State Historical Society of North Dakota.

References

External links

Friends of Oscar-Zero
Ronald Reagan Minuteman Missile State Historic Site - State Historical Society of North Dakota
Historic American Engineering Record documentation filed under Cooperstown, Griggs County, ND:

Historic American Engineering Record documentation filed under Grand Forks, Grand Forks County, ND:

Military facilities on the National Register of Historic Places in North Dakota
Museums in Griggs County, North Dakota
Military and war museums in North Dakota
Cold War museums in the United States
Historic American Engineering Record in North Dakota
National Register of Historic Places in Griggs County, North Dakota
Nuclear missiles of the United States